Kennedy Goss (born August 19, 1996) is a Canadian competitive swimmer. Goss won 7 medals at the 2013 Canada Games, including 5 gold.

In 2016, she was named to Canada's Olympic team for the 2016 Summer Olympics as part of the 4x200 metre freestyle relay team.

Personal life
Her father Sandy Goss is a former competitive swimmer for Canada, and competed at the 1984 Summer Olympics and 1988 Summer Olympics, winning two silver medals.

Kennedy competes for The Indiana University Hoosiers.

References

External links
 
 
 
 
 
 

1996 births
Living people
Canadian female freestyle swimmers
Swimmers from Toronto
Swimmers at the 2016 Summer Olympics
Medalists at the 2016 Summer Olympics
Olympic bronze medalists for Canada
Olympic bronze medalists in swimming
Olympic swimmers of Canada
Medalists at the FINA World Swimming Championships (25 m)
Universiade medalists in swimming
Universiade gold medalists for Canada
Indiana Hoosiers women's swimmers
Medalists at the 2017 Summer Universiade
20th-century Canadian women
21st-century Canadian women